Aureopteryx glorialis is a moth in the family Crambidae. It was described by Schaus in 1920. It is found in French Guiana.

References

Glaphyriinae
Moths described in 1920
Moths of South America